Bristol High Cross is a monumental market cross erected in 1373 in the centre of Bristol. It was built in Decorated Gothic style on the site of an earlier Anglo-Saxon cross, to commemorate the granting of a charter by Edward III to make Bristol a county, separate from Somerset and Gloucestershire.  In 1764 it was moved to the Stourhead estate in Wiltshire, where it still stands.

Construction

The cross stood in the centre of the town, at the crossroads of its four main streets. After it was enlarged in 1663, it was in four tiers. The base was four octagonal piers with cusped ogee arches. The next two tiers contained alcoves with statues of English monarchs. The top tier was a pinnacle with the actual cross as a finial.  The material was oolitic limestone but, as this was susceptible to frost damage, this was subsequently painted in colours of blue, gold, red and vermilion.  The vermilion was the predominant colour of the statues, being used for their dresses, and aged well.

Location

The base of the cross displayed statues of monarchs in alcoves. In 1663, the cross was rebuilt to add a third tier for four more statues and the total complement of eight was then:

 North facing Broad Street—King John; Charles I
 East facing Wine Street—Henry III; Henry VI
 West facing Corn Street—Edward III; Elizabeth I
 South facing High Street—Edward IV; James I

The cross's central location made it the natural place for special events. In 1399, supporters of Richard II were beheaded there by order of Henry Bolinbroke, after a short siege of Bristol. These included Richard's Lord High Treasurer, William le Scrope, Sir John Bussy and Sir Henry Green. The following year, Thomas le Despenser, 1st Earl of Gloucester, was beheaded there for his part in the Epiphany Rising against Bolinbroke who was now King Henry IV.

In 1487, it was the scene of ceremonies to greet Henry VII when he visited Bristol. In 1542, Bristol was proclaimed a bishopric at the cross. In 1554, Queen Mary and King Philip were there proclaimed joint sovereigns over England. In 1603, James I was proclaimed King of England by recorder George Snigge and the city dignitaries standing at the cross in their finery.

Relocation

As Bristol prospered, the cross became an obstruction to traffic.  In 1733 a nearby silversmith John Vaughan who occupied the building later known as the Dutch House complained that the cross threatened his life and property whenever there was a high wind and so persuaded the magistrates to have the cross taken down.  The parts were stored in the guildhall until Alderman Price and other citizens arranged for it to be erected again in spring 1736 on College Green by the cathedral.  It was there admired as a quaint antiquity but it only took thirty years for it once again to be thought an obstruction.  This time, the complaints came from the visitors who had come to the spa of Hotwells.  They were wont to promenade on the green in line abreast and the cross impeded the great numbers so inclined – lines of eight or more.  A fund was collected to improve the green as a promenade but this was exhausted in raising the green.  The cross was once again removed in August 1762, and the pieces of the cross lay disassembled in  the great cloister of cathedral.  In October 1764, Dean Cutts-Barton then gave it to Henry "the Magnificent" Hoare and the materials except the very worn lower columns were carted away to adorn his grand estate of Stourhead in Wiltshire, where it was rebuilt in 1765.  It remains there now in the care of the National Trust.

Replica

The Victorian citizens of Bristol sought to regain their cross but the original was now too fragile to be moved again. In 1851 they commissioned architect John Norton to build a replica which would again stand upon College Green.  Norton inspected the original closely to copy its design and then engaged John Thomas, the celebrated mason and stone carver who had recently worked upon the new Palace of Westminster, to construct the body of the cross.  The funds for the work were exhausted after only one statue had been completed—Edward III—and so the replica stood for many years with the other alcoves remaining empty. The remaining statues, commissioned from a prolific craftsman of the region, Harry Hems, were eventually installed in 1889, after the cross had been moved from the apex to the centre of the green to make way for the new jubilee statue of Queen Victoria.

Because the architect of the new Council House didn’t want anything in front of his new creation, the 1851 replica cross was taken down when College Green was lowered around October 1950 and stored in pieces in the corporation yard on Redcliffe Wharf. The upper stage of the replica cross was saved by fundraising and re-erected during a small ceremony in 1956 in nearby Berkeley Square.

Statues

Four of the statues of the original cross at Stourhead were replaced by replicas in 1980, with the originals placed on indefinite loan with the Victoria and Albert Museum in London.

See also
 Bewell's Cross

References

Grade I listed buildings in Wiltshire
Monuments and memorials in Bristol
Monumental crosses in England
National Trust properties in Wiltshire
Market crosses in England